J. Mohideen Abdul Khadar, known by his stage name Rajkiran, is an Indian actor, producer and director, who has acted in more than 30 Tamil films.

Early life
Rajkiran was born as J. Mohideen Abdul Khadar on 16 March 1949 at Keelakarai into a Muslim family.

Film career

Rajkiran began by producing two Ramarajan starrer films and in one of them he appeared in a brief role. In 1991, he produced and acted in lead role in Kasthuri Raja's debut film, En Rasavin Manasile which had a silver jubilee run. He won the Tamil Nadu State Film Award Special Prize and the Cinema Express – Best New Face Award for his performance. He directed, produced and acted in lead role in Aranmanai Kili (1993) and Ellame En Rasathan (1995), which also had silver jubilee runs. In 1996, he acted in Manikkam which was an average grosser at the box-office. The following year, he worked in Pasamulla Pandiyare. The film turned out to be a failure. In the mid of 1998, he acted in Ponnu Velayira Bhoomi and made a guest appearance in Kasthuri Raja's Veera Thalattu. In the end of 1998, he acted in the critically well received Thalaimurai. Following a three-year hiatus, he returned as an actor in Bala's Nandha and in Cheran's Pandavar Bhoomi. Both were critically and commercial success. He has won the Filmfare Best Tamil Supporting Actor Award for his performance in the film Thavamai Thavamirundhu(2005) and the Tamil Nadu government's Best Actor award for Pandavar Bhoomi (2001). Raj Kiran has signed a new project with director Karu Pazhaniappan. He acted in Muni as Ghost character Muniyaandi. He later appeared in movies like  Kaavalan (2011), Ponnar Shankar (2011), Venghai (2011) and Thiruthani (2012). He has also featured in many TV commercials as well. He also claimed not to do a dhoti advertisement which created a lot of news in 2015. He acted in lead role in the movie Pa Paandi in 2017. In 2020, he was debuted in a Malayalam Film Shylock with Mammootty as a role in a character named Ayyannar.

Filmography

Off-screen roles

References

External links
 

|-
! colspan="3" style="background: #DAA520;" | Filmfare Awards South
|-

|-

Tamil male actors
Living people
Tamil Nadu State Film Awards winners
Filmfare Awards South winners
1955 births
Tamil-language film directors
Tamil film directors
Male actors from Tamil Nadu
People from Ramanathapuram district
Tamil screenwriters
20th-century Indian male actors
21st-century Indian male actors
Film directors from Tamil Nadu
Screenwriters from Tamil Nadu
Tamil film producers
Film producers from Tamil Nadu